Sergiy Demchuk (Ukrainian: Сергій Демчук) is a paralympic swimmer from Ukraine competing mainly in category S12 events.

Sergiy was part of the Ukrainian Paralympic swimming team that travelled to both the 2004 and 2008 Summer Paralympics.  In 2004 he was part of the Ukrainian squad that broke the world record and won gold in both the  freestyle and the  medley.  He was not as successful in individual events, he failed to make the final of the 50m and 100m freestyle and finished seventh in the 100m butterfly.  He did not compete in the relays in 2008 but competed in the same individual events and again he missed out on the finals in the 50m and 100m freestyle events and finished sixth in the 100m butterfly.

References

External links
 

Year of birth missing (living people)
Living people
Ukrainian male freestyle swimmers
Paralympic swimmers of Ukraine
Paralympic gold medalists for Ukraine
Paralympic medalists in swimming
Swimmers at the 2004 Summer Paralympics
Swimmers at the 2008 Summer Paralympics
Medalists at the 2004 Summer Paralympics
Ukrainian male butterfly swimmers
S12-classified Paralympic swimmers
21st-century Ukrainian people